There are two newspapers in Greenland.  
Atuagagdliutit/Grønlandsposten
Sermitsiaq

References

Greenland